Antonio Alzona Aguto Jr. (born November 18, 1966) is a United States Army lieutenant general who serves as the commander of Security Assistance Group–Ukraine since December 2022. He most recently served as the 40th commanding general of First United States Army from July 8, 2021, to December 2, 2022. He previously served as the Commanding General of the 3rd Infantry Division and prior to that served as the Deputy Chief of Staff for Operations, Plans, and Training of the United States Army Forces Command.

Aguto is a 1988 graduate of the United States Military Academy with a B.S. degree in aerospace engineering. He served as the commanding officer of the 11th Armored Cavalry Regiment from 2010 to 2012 and the 7th Army Training Command from July 2016 to May 2018.

References

External links
 

1966 births
Living people
People from Illinois
Military personnel from Illinois
United States Military Academy alumni
United States Army generals